Agnihal  is a village in the southern state of Karnataka, India. Administratively, it is under Gonal panchayat village, Shahapur Taluka of Yadgir district in Karnataka.

Demographics 
 census, Agnihal had 477 inhabitants, with 235 males (49.3%) and 242 females (50.7%), for a gender ratio of 1,030 females per thousand males.

See also
 Shahapur
 Yadgir

References

External links
 

Villages in Yadgir district